HMS Havant was an H-class destroyer originally ordered by the Brazilian Navy with the name Javary in the late 1930s, but was bought by the Royal Navy after the beginning of World War II in September 1939. The ship was initially assigned to escort duties in the Western Approaches, but was transferred to the Home Fleet when the Norwegian Campaign began in April 1940. She was only peripherally involved in the campaign as she escorted ships carrying troops that occupied Iceland and the Faeroe Islands as well as convoys to Narvik. Havant was evacuating troops from Dunkirk when she was badly damaged by Junkers Ju 87 Stuka dive bombers on 1 June and had to be scuttled.

Description
Steam for the turbines was provided by three Admiralty 3-drum water-tube boilers. The ship's complement was 145 officers and men.

The ship was designed for four 45-calibre 4.7-inch Mk IX guns in single mounts, designated 'A', 'B', 'X', and 'Y' from front to rear, but 'Y' gun was removed to compensate for the additional depth charges added. For anti-aircraft (AA) defence, Havant had two quadruple Mark I mounts for the 0.5 inch Vickers Mark III machine gun. She was fitted with two above-water quadruple torpedo tube mounts for  torpedoes. One depth charge rail and two throwers were originally fitted, but this was increased to 3 sets of rails and eight throwers while fitting-out. The ship's load of depth charges was increased from 20 to 110 as well.

Service

Javary was ordered by Brazil on 8 December 1937 from J. Samuel White, Cowes. The ship was laid down on 30 March 1938 and launched on 17 July 1939. She was purchased by the British on 5 September and renamed HMS Havant. The ship was commissioned on 19 December and arrived at Portland Harbour on 8 January 1940 to begin working up. She made one unsuccessful anti-submarine sweep 4–9 February with the destroyers  and  after she was assigned to the 9th Destroyer Flotilla of the Western Approaches Command at Plymouth. Havant had degaussing equipment fitted and minor repairs were made through March.

The ship was en route to Greenock to escort a convoy to Gibraltar on 7 April when she was transferred to the Home Fleet as a result of the impending German invasion of Norway. Along with her sister , Havant escorted the heavy cruiser  on 13 April as the latter ship carried a detachment of Royal Marines to occupy the Faeroe Islands. The ship then escorted convoys to Narvik until 7 May.

Havant joined the Dunkirk evacuation on 29 May and rescued over 2,300 men by 1 June. That morning she had embarked 500 troops and then went alongside the destroyer , which had been disabled by German dive bombers earlier that morning. The ship loaded all of the troops and wounded from Ivanhoe and sailed for Dover under heavy air attack. Shortly afterwards, Stukas hit Havant with two bombs in her engine room and another exploded beneath her hull. Eight crewmen were killed and 25 were wounded in the attack. At least 25 soldiers were also killed. She was severely damaged and had to be scuttled by the minesweeper  after an attempt to tow her failed.

Notes

References
 
 
 
 
 

 

Jurua-class destroyers
Ships built on the Isle of Wight
1939 ships
G and H-class destroyers of the Royal Navy
World War II destroyers of the United Kingdom
Maritime incidents in June 1940
World War II shipwrecks in the North Sea
Destroyers sunk by aircraft
Ships sunk by German aircraft